The term Hexameron (Greek: Ἡ Ἑξαήμερος Δημιουργία Hē Hexaēmeros Dēmiourgia) refers either to the genre of theological treatise that describes God's work on the six days of creation or to the six days of creation themselves. Most often these theological works take the form of commentaries on Genesis. As a genre, hexameral literature was popular in the early church and medieval periods. The word derives its name from the Greek roots hexa-, meaning "six", and hemer-, meaning "day".

The order of creation in Genesis (1,1 to 2,3) is:
 Light - first day.
 A vault between the waters, to separate water from water called the heavens - second day.
 The water ... gathered ... so that dry land may appear ... and ... growing things, ... plants that bear seed, and trees bearing fruit each with its own kind of seed - third day.
 Lights in the vault of the heavens - fourth day: sun, moon, and stars.
 "Let the water teem with living creatures, and let birds fly above the earth" - fifth day.
 "Let the earth bring forth living creatures ... and ... let us make human beings in our image" - sixth day.
 On the seventh day, having finished all his work, God blessed the day - the Sabbath.

Based on this framework, Christian and Jewish authors have written treatises that cover a wide variety of topics, including cosmology, science, theology, theological anthropology, and God's nature.

Saint Basil wrote an early and influential series of homilies around 370 AD which figure as the earliest extant Hexameron. Basil originally performed the work as a series of sermons, and later collected them into a written work which was influential among early church leaders.

Among the Latin Fathers, Ambrose and Augustine of Hippo wrote some of the earliest extant hexameral literature.  Ambrose's Hexameron is heavily influenced by Basil's work of the same name. In contrast, Augustine wrote several works that serve as commentaries on the Genesis narrative, including the final section of The Confessions and The Literal Meaning of Genesis (published in 416). One of the more influential elements of Augustine's writings is his argument that God created the world all at once. At the same time, this instantaneous creation included a progression of events. Thus, creation happened over six days and in one single event.

Following these figures, medieval writers such as Thomas Aquinas, Bonaventure, and Robert Grosseteste  wrote hexameral literature.

Hexameral literature
Hexameral literature is the medieval Christian literature based on the creation narratives found in the first two chapters of the Book of Genesis. It was commentary or elaboration, sometimes taking on encyclopedic scope, regarding the cosmological and theological implications of the world or universe created in six days.

It was didactic in nature. The approach continued in an important literary role until the seventeenth century.

Terminology
The Oxford English Dictionary recognizes a difference between ‘hexaemeric’, pertaining to a ‘hexaemeron’ or six-day creation (or commentary thereon); and ‘hexameral’, meaning simply in six parts. This distinction is often slurred.

Not every ‘Hexameron’ or ‘Hexaemeron’ is actually part of the genre, since Genesis commentaries can have various themes. Hexameral historical theories, of six or seven eras, date back at least to the City of God of Augustine of Hippo.

History
This literary genre was founded by the Hexaemeron of Basil of Caesarea; though it has been said that Philo started it.

Examples include:

Ambrose, Hexaemeron, in Latin and the most influential
Augustine of Hippo, De Genesi ad litteram, 401–415, influenced by Plato and Greek biology
Pseudo-Eustathius, Commentary on the Hexameron, in Greek
Jacob of Serugh, (ca. 5-6th century), Hexameron Syria
Jacob of Edessa, (ca. 6-7th century) Hexaemeron (completed by George, Bishop of the Arabs). 
Bede, In Genesim. 
Anastasius Sinaita, Hexaemeron
John the Exarch, (ca. 9th century.) Hexameron, Preslav, Bulgaria
Robert Grosseteste, (ca. 1230) Hexaemeron
Henry of Langenstein (1385) Lecturae super Genesim
It extended into early modern times with the Sepmaines of Du Bartas, and Paradise Lost by John Milton. According to Alban Forcione the late sixteenth and early seventeenth century saw ‘hexameral theatre’, and in particular the visionary holism represented by the De la creación del mundo (1615) of Alonso de Acevedo. There is a cusp between Du Bartas, very influential in his time, and Milton: Milton's different approach marks the effective literary end of the genre.

See also
Allegorical interpretations of Genesis
Commentary on the Hexameron
Framework interpretation (Genesis)
Genesis creation narrative
Numerology for the implications of the number 6 in other mysticism
Six Ages of the World

Notes

References
Frank Egleston Robbins (1912), The Hexaemeral Literature
Mary Irma Corcoran (1945), Milton's Paradise with Reference to the Hexameral Background

Further reading
Freibergs, Gunar. "The Medieval Latin Hexameron from Bede to Grosseteste," Ph.D. dissertation (unpublished), University of Southern California, 1981.
E. Grant. Science and Religion, 400 BC-AD 1550: From Aristotle to Copernicus. Baltimore: Johns Hopkins University Press, 2004.
C. Kuehn and J. Baggarly, eds. and trans. Anastasius of Sinai: Hexaemeron (OCA 278). Rome: Pontificio Istituto Orientale, 2007.
F.E. Robbins. The Hexaemeral Literature: A Study of the Greek and Latin Commentaries on Genesis. Chicago: University of Chicago Press, 1912.
Rudolph, Conrad, "In the Beginning: Theories and Images of Creation in Northern Europe in the Twelfth Century," Art History 22 (1999) 3-55
Williams, Arnold. The Common Expositor: An Account of the Commentaries on Genesis, 1527-1633, The University of North Carolina Press, 1948.
 Basil of Caesarea, Hexaemeron, London, 2013. limovia.net

External links 
 Hexameron (internet archive link of this page)
 Hexaimeron.ro - How to read Genesis - Hieromonk Serafim Rose
 Many writings of Basil, including his treatise on Hexameron
 The Hexaemeron by Anastasius Sinaita
 

Christian cosmology
Book of Genesis
Medieval literature